UUC Football Club (University of Ulster at Coleraine Football Club), originally called NUU (New University of Ulster was a Northern Irish, intermediate football club that played in the B Division of the Irish League from 1975 to 1983. The club was connected to the University of Ulster and was based in Coleraine. The club played in the Irish Cup in 1982-83.

References 

Association football clubs in County Londonderry
Defunct association football clubs in Northern Ireland
Association football clubs disestablished in 1983
1983 disestablishments in Northern Ireland